Saint Beatrice may refer to:

 Beatrice or Beatrix, 4th-century martyr - see Simplicius, Faustinus and Beatrix
 Saint Beatrice d'Este (1191–1226), Italian Roman Catholic saint
 Beatrice of Silva (1424–1492), Portuguese nun

See also
 Blessed Beatrice of Nazareth (1200-1268), Flemish nun
 Blessed Beatrice of Ornacieux (ca. 1240–1306/1309), French nun